Peoria City is a soccer club from Peoria, Illinois that plays in the Deep North Division in USL League Two. The team's colors are Gold and Black.

History
The club was founded by former K–W United owner Barry MacLean along with John Dorn with former Major League Soccer player Tim Regan serving as the inaugural head coach. The club was announced as a new expansion club, set to begin play in the 2020 season, however, their entrance was delayed to 2021, as the 2020 season was cancelled due to the COVID-19 pandemic. Their entrance was further delayed, with the team announcing in January 2022 that they would begin play in the 2022 season.

2022 season
Peoria City opened the 2022 season on May 14, 2022 where a crowd of 1,114 were in attendance to watch Peoria City play to a 2-2 draw against Minneapolis City SC On July 15th . Peoria City Qualified for the USL League 2 playoffs After Thunder Bay lost to Manitoba and Peoria, qualifying on tie breaking method. Peoria City lost 3-1 in the first round to Chicago FC United.

Year by Year

References

USL League Two teams
Association football clubs established in 2020
Soccer clubs in Illinois
Sports in Peoria, Illinois